Ronaldus de Boer (born 15 May 1970) is a Dutch former professional footballer who played as a midfielder. He played for the Netherlands national team as well as a host of professional clubs in Europe. He is the twin brother of Frank de Boer. The majority of his success as a football player was with Ajax. He works as the Ajax A1 assistant manager.

Club career
De Boer's first youth club was De Zouaven in Lutjebroek where he played before being selected for the Ajax youth programme in 1983. On the professional club level, De Boer played for Ajax (1988–91 and 1993–99), Twente (1991–93), Barcelona (1999–2000), Rangers (2000–04), Al-Rayyan (2004–05) and Al-Shamal (2005–08). In both Qatari clubs, he was reunited again with his brother Frank, his teammate at Ajax, Barcelona and Rangers.

In his first spell at Ajax from 1988 to 1991, he won the Eredivisie title in 1989–90 under manager Leo Beenhakker. After two seasons at Twente from 1991 to 1993, he returned to Ajax under manager Louis van Gaal, and had his most successful spell as a player, winning three consecutive Eredivisie titles in 1993–94, 1994–95 and 1995–96. He also won the 1995 UEFA Champions League, the 1995 Intercontinental Cup, and the 1995 UEFA Super Cup. He was also a runner-up of the 1996 UEFA Champions League, where Ajax lost on penalties to Juventus. When Louis van Gaal left Ajax for Barcelona in July 1997, Morten Olsen became the new Ajax manager, and De Boer won a fifth Eredivisie title in 1997–98 and also won the 1997–98 KNVB Cup.

There was then controversy soon after De Boer and his twin brother Frank signed a six-year contract extension with Ajax at the start 1998–99 season, when Ronald and Frank took successful legal action to have the contract voided. Ajax had agreed verbally that if a lucrative offer for one brother came by, he would be released provided the other stayed. Ajax, however, apparently backed down on that agreement after floating the club on the stock market and pledging to shareholders that it would hold both of the De Boers and build around them a team to recapture the UEFA Champions League.

The fallout over the contract situation led to an increasing conflict between the De Boer twins and the Ajax hierarchy, with match results for Ajax suffering and manager Morten Olsen soon getting sacked. In January 1999, Frank and Ronald signed for Barcelona for  £22 million, joining their former Ajax manager Louis van Gaal at the Camp Nou.

While De Boer was impressive at Ajax during the 1990s and for the Netherlands up to and including the 1998 FIFA World Cup, his high-profile transfer to Barcelona in January 1999 marked what would be an unlikely bad patch for a prolific goal-scoring midfielder, as he managed to feature in only 33 La Liga games for the club and scored just one goal in La Liga. In the 2000–01 season, he opted to join the Dutch legion at Rangers under the manager Dick Advocaat. Among the Dutch internationals who at that time played for Rangers were Bert Konterman, Arthur Numan, Fernando Ricksen and Giovanni van Bronckhorst. De Boer made his debut in a Scottish League Cup tie against Aberdeen on 6 September 2000, and scored his first goal for the club in a UEFA Champions League tie against Sturm Graz. De Boer didn't win any silverware at the end of his first season at the club, but the following season (2001–02) Rangers won both the Scottish League Cup and the Scottish Cup, though De Boer missed the former final through injury. The following season, 2002–03, brought even more success as De Boer helped Rangers win a domestic treble of league, Scottish Cup and Scottish League Cup. In total he spent four seasons with the club before joining Al-Rayyan after the 2003–04 season.

De Boer recovered from surgery on a neck injury and decided not to play in Al-Shamal's last two games of the 2006–07 season. On 19 March 2008, De Boer canceled his contract with Qatari outfit Al-Shamal and retired.

International career

De Boer won 67 caps and scored 13 goals for the Netherlands national team. He played for the Netherlands in the 1994 and the 1998 World Cups, where he played in six matches and scored two goals. He missed a penalty in the penalty shootout against Brazil in the 1998 semi-finals. De Boer also played in Euro 1996 and Euro 2000.

In the Dutch national team, De Boer was used in various positions, including right-half, centre forward and attacking midfielder. In his early Ajax years, De Boer played either centre forward or attacking midfielder. In later years, he shifted to right midfield.

De Boer was never officially captain of the Dutch national team or Ajax, but he has worn the captain's armband on several occasions for both club teams and the national team when the first-choice captain was not playing. In most teams, this was his brother Frank, with whom he has played side by side for most of his career.

Managerial career
De Boer is Ajax A1 assistant manager.

Media
De Boer featured in EA Sports' FIFA video game series; he was on the cover for the International edition of FIFA 96, alongside Jason McAteer.

Career statistics

Club

International

Honours
Ajax
Eredivisie: 1989–90, 1993–94, 1994–95, 1995–96, 1997–98
KNVB Cup: 1997–98
Johan Cruyff Shield: 1993, 1994, 1995
UEFA Champions League: 1994–95
UEFA Super Cup: 1995
Intercontinental Cup: 1995

Barcelona
La Liga: 1998–99

Rangers
Scottish Premier League: 2002–03
Scottish Cup: 2001–02, 2002–03
Scottish League Cup: 2002–03

Al Rayyan
Emir of Qatar Cup: 2005

Individual
Dutch Footballer of the Year: 1994, 1996
Ballon d'Or: 1996 (28th), 1998 (21st)

References

External links

 
 

1970 births
Living people
People from Hoorn
Identical twins
Dutch twins
Twin sportspeople
Association football forwards
Dutch association football commentators
Dutch footballers
Netherlands international footballers
AFC Ajax players
FC Twente players
FC Barcelona players
Rangers F.C. players
Al-Rayyan SC players
Al-Shamal SC players
Eredivisie players
La Liga players
Scottish Premier League players
Qatar Stars League players
1994 FIFA World Cup players
1998 FIFA World Cup players
UEFA Euro 1996 players
UEFA Euro 2000 players
Dutch expatriate footballers
Expatriate footballers in Spain
Expatriate footballers in Scotland
Expatriate footballers in Qatar
Dutch expatriate sportspeople in Spain
Dutch expatriate sportspeople in Scotland
Dutch expatriate sportspeople in Qatar
AFC Ajax non-playing staff
UEFA Champions League winning players
VV De Zouaven players
Footballers from North Holland